Tisaniba is a genus of spiders in the family Salticidae. It was first described in 2014 by Zhang & Maddison. , it contains 6 species, all found in Borneo.

Species
Tisaniba comprises the following species:
Tisaniba bijibijan Zhang & Maddison, 2014
Tisaniba dik Zhang & Maddison, 2014
Tisaniba kubah Zhang & Maddison, 2014
Tisaniba mulu Zhang & Maddison, 2014
Tisaniba selan Zhang & Maddison, 2014
Tisaniba selasi Zhang & Maddison, 2014

References

Salticidae
Salticidae genera
Spiders of Asia